Ronald Backus (28 March 1922 – 27 July 1999) was a British competitive sailor and Olympic medalist. He won a bronze medal in the Dragon class at the 1956 Summer Olympics in Melbourne, together with Graham Mann and Jonathan Janson. He was born in Poole, Wiltshire, England.

References

External links
 
 

1922 births
1999 deaths
Sportspeople from Poole
People from Wiltshire
British male sailors (sport)
Sailors at the 1956 Summer Olympics – Dragon
Olympic sailors of Great Britain
Olympic bronze medallists for Great Britain
Olympic medalists in sailing
Medalists at the 1956 Summer Olympics